Dziura Nunatak is an ice-free nunatak,  high, located  northwest of Mount Remington in the northwestern extremity of the Helliwell Hills of Victoria Land, Antarctica. The geographical feature was first mapped by the United States Geological Survey from surveys and from U.S. Navy air photos, 1960–63, and was named by the Advisory Committee on Antarctic Names for Charles S. Dziura, a United States Antarctic Research Program meteorologist at the South Pole Station, 1967–68. This nunatak notably lies situated on the Pennell Coast, a portion of Antarctica lying between Cape Williams and Cape Adare.

References 

Nunataks of Victoria Land
Pennell Coast